{{DISPLAYTITLE:C10H11ClO3}}
The molecular formula C10H11ClO3 (molar mass: 214.64 g/mol, exact mass: 214.0397 u) may refer to:

 Clofibric acid
 Mecoprop (MCPP)